Perdiccas  may refer to:

Historical persons
 Perdiccas I of Macedon, king from 700 to 678 BC
 Perdiccas II of Macedon, king from 454 to 413 BC
 Perdiccas III of Macedon,  king from 365 to 359 BC
 Perdiccas, "Regent of the Empire"(died 321/320 BC), earlier general under Alexander the Great
 Perdiccas (died 321 BC), commander under Eumenes

Fictional characters
 Perdikkas, one of the main characters in the historical novel Funeral Games, by Mary Renault
 Perdikkas, one of the characters in the historical novel Roxana Romance by A. J. Cave

Places

 Perdikkas, Kozani, village in Greece